The 1990 Munster Senior Hurling Championship Final was a hurling match played on Sunday 15 July 1990 at Semple Stadium. It was contested by Cork and Tipperary. Cork captained by Kieran McGuckin claimed the title beating defending champions Tipperary on a scoreline of 4–16 to 2–14.

References

External links
Match Video
Official Programme Cover

Munster
Munster Senior Hurling Championship Finals
Tipperary GAA matches
Cork county hurling team matches